This is a list of Italian television related events from 1954.

Events 

 3 January. After five years of experimentation, the speaker Fulvia Colombo announces from the Milan studios, the official beginning of the TV broadcasting on Italy. This is the schedule of the day:

The TV signal covers Northern Italy, Rome and the Tyrrhenian side of Central Italy. The transmissions last four hours and a quarter by day (from 5:30 to 11:30 PM, with a pause from 7 to 8:45; from 11 AM to 4 PM and from 5 PM to 11:30 PM during the holidays). The TV programming relies on music, plays and films; the news are strictly institutional and focused on the official ceremonies. The subscribers to the new media are initially just 90, but a month later they numbner already 24,000 people.

 26 January. The first Italian teleplay, La Domenica di un fidanzato (see below) is aired.
 29 January. First live broadcast of a football match (Italy-Egypt, from San Siro Stadium, valid for the 1954 World Cup qualification). The commentators are Carlo Bacarelli, Vittorio Veltroni (father of Walter) and Nicolò Carosio, historical voice of the sport on radio. In June, the 1954 football world cup is the first major sport event followed by the Italian television.
January–March :The RAI publishes its “TV self-discipline code”, inspired by the moral criteria of the Centro cattolico Cinematografico (Catholic Cinematografic Center).
 28 February. First live broadcast of a current event (the carnival of Viareggio).
26 March: First political debate, about the taxman, with the ministers Ezio Vanoni and Roberto Tremelloni.
 10 April. RAI changes its business name from Radio Audizioni Italiane (Italian Radio Auditions) to Radio Televisione Italiana (Italian Radio Television).
18 April: For Easter, RAI broadcasts the “Urbi et Orbi” blessing of Pope Pius XII, who is the first pope to appear on TV.
23 April. First opera (The Barber of Seville) realized in the studio, directed by Franco Enriquez.
 3 June. The Catholic Filiberto Guala is appointed RAI's Delegate Manager. His most important choice is the assumption, after a formative course, of three hundred young intellectuals (the so-called “white corsairs”) to balance the influence of the ancient managers (generally liberals or former fascists). Among the “white corsairs”, there are people with a brilliant future, like Umberto Eco, Gianni Vattimo, Furio Colombo, Piero Angela and Andrea Camilleri.
6 June. RAI takes part to the Eurovision’s birth. Immediately after the opening show (the Narcissuses Feast, from Montreux), the Italian TV broadcasts for the whole Europe a speech by Pope Pius XII.
 16 November. The first Italian miniseries, Il dottor Antonio (see below) is aired.
 10 December. The fee for televisions is instituted. At the end of the year, the subscribers include 88,000 locations. Most of these TV tubes are located in public places, because of the high price of both the fee and the TV sets.

Debuts 

Un, due, tre (One, two, three) – variety, directed by Mario Landi, lasted for six seasons. It is conceived as a parade of international stars, but soon the comic duo Ugo Tognazzi and Raimondo Vianello wins the audience's attention and becomes the focus of the show.  Some of their sketches caricaturing other TV shows; as Mario Soldati's Travel in the Po valley, looking for genuine foods (with Vianello as the writer-gastronome) or the enquiry The working woman (with Tognazzi in woman dress) are very popular today again. After five years of huge critic and public success, the show is roughly suppressed, because of a sketch where the duo, using the freedom of the live broadcast, politely mocked the president Giovanni Gronchi.
Una risposta per voi (An answer for you) – educational program, lasted 13 seasons. The university professor Alessandro Cutolo answers to the letters of the viewers on every subject.

Television shows 

 Arrivi e partenze (Arrivals and departures) – magazine of interviews, in ports and airports, to the VIP coming to or leaving Italy. The interviewers are Armando Pizzo and Mike Bongiorno, whose decades-long career of TV showman started; the director is Antonello Falqui.
 Il dottor Antonio ( Doctor Antonio) – in 4 episodes, from the Giovanni Ruffini’s novel about the Italian Risorgimento, directed by Alberto Casella, with Luciano Alberici. It's the first Italian miniseries; its success, moreover among the female audience, will encourage RAI, in the following years, to carry on the production of period dramas.

Drama 

 La domenica di un fidanzato (A boyfriend's Sunday) – by Ugo Buzzolan, directed by Mario Ferrero, with Giorgio De Lullo and Bianca Toccafondi. It's the first Italian teleplay, now lost. Buzzolan, later, will become the severe and authoritative TV critic of La Stampa.
Delitto e castigo (Crimes and punishment) – from the Dostoevsky’s novel, directed by Franco Enriquez, with Giorgio Albertazzi and Bianca Toccafondi. 
 Il ventaglio (The fan) – by Carlo Goldoni, directed by Franco Enriquez and Carlo Lodovici.
 Romeo and Juliet – by Shakespeare, directed by Franco Enriquez, with Giorgio Albertazzi, Vira Silenti, and Leonardo Cortese.

Ending this year

Births

Deaths

See also 

 List of Italian films of 1954

References